Shame on Me: An Anatomy of Race and Belonging is a collection of autobiographical essays by Guyana-born Canadian writer Tessa McWatt, published on March 24, 2020, by Random House Canada.

Reception 
Shame on Me received a starred review from Quill & Quire, which said: "Tessa McWatt’s original and moving memoir, interrogates ideas of race, belonging, shame, purpose, destiny, desire, and identity. Through an examination of her physical body, she holds up a mirror to the ways culture and society read race and the bodies of others – their skin, hair, bones, and more. She does this with remarkable research and precision – an anatomical and literary close-reading of her own history and heritage." Among other positive reviews were those appearing in Caribbean Collective Magazine ("a vivid picture of how oppressive regimes from colonial times follow us to the modern day"), Medium ("McWatt seamlessly connects the past and present...a beautifully woven account"), CBC Books ("a personal and powerful exploration of history and identity"), and in The Guardian, where Barbara Taylor described Shame on Me as an "eloquent and moving book". CBC named it one of the top nonfiction books of 2020. The book also received the following accolades:

 Governor General's Literary Award for Nonfiction finalist (2020)
 OCM Bocas Prize for Caribbean Literature shortlist (2021)

References

External links 
 "40 works of Canadian nonfiction to watch for in spring 2020", CBC Books, March 5, 2020.
 "The CBC Books 2020 summer reading list", CBC Books, June 30, 2020.
 "Tessa McWatt explores race through the lens of her own multi-ethnic identity in her latest book", CBC Radio, May 8, 2020.
 Ryan B. Patrick, "How life in a Trumpian, post-Brexit world prompted Tessa McWatt to explore race and identity in her new memoir", CBC Books, June 3, 2020.
 "25 books by Black Canadian authors to read in 2021", CBC Books, February 18, 2021.
 "20 books by Black Canadian authors to read in honour of Emancipation Day 2021", CBC Books,  July 30, 2021.

Canadian memoirs
2020 non-fiction books
Random House books